The following is a List of hospitals in Belarus.  In 1994 there were 127 hospital beds and forty-two doctors per 10,000 inhabitants. The country had 131,000 hospital beds at 868 hospitals.

Notable hospitals

Gallery

References

List of hospitals in Belarus
Belarus
Hospitals
Belarus